— colloquially known as  — is a national university in Japan. Although formally established as a university in 1949, Shima-dai's origins date back to the late 19th century. In 2003 it merged with the Shimane Medical University (established in 1975). It is a multi-disciplinary university, with faculties in law and literature, education, medicine, science and engineering, and life and environmental science. The university has graduate schools in humanities and social sciences, education, medical research, science and engineering, life and environmental science, and law. Shima-dai has approximately 6,000 students (including over 750 post-graduate and doctoral students), more than 750 academic staff and over 400 support staff. It was the first public university in Japan to establish an interdisciplinary department integrating natural sciences and engineering. The motto is 'Shimane University — growing with people and with the region' (人とともに　地域とともに　島根大学).

Location/campuses
Located in Shimane Prefecture in western Honshu, the university has campuses in Matsue City (the prefectural capital) and Izumo City (one hour to the west of Matsue). The Matsue campus is home to the university's Law & Literature, Education, Science & Engineering, and Life & Environmental Science faculties, as well as the university's central administration. The Izumo campus is home to the university's Medical Faculty comprising the Medical School, Nursing School and University Hospital.

Academics

Faculties and departments
Shimane University comprises the following faculties, departments and schools:

Faculty of Law & Literature - Department of Law & Economics; Department of Socio-cultural Studies, Department of Language and Culture
Faculty of Education - School Teacher Training Course; affiliated kindergarten; affiliated elementary school; affiliated junior high school
Faculty of Medicine - School of Medicine; School of Nursing; University Hospital
Interdisciplinary Faculty of Science & Engineering - Department of Material Science; Department of Geoscience; Department of Mathematics & Computer Science; Department of Electronic & Control Systems Engineering; Department of Natural Resources Process Engineering
Faculty of Life & Environmental Science - Department of Biological Science; Department of Life Science & Biotechnology; Department of Agricultural & Forest Sciences; Department of Regional Environmental Sciences; Education & Research Center for Biological Resources

Graduate schools
Shimane University also has the following graduate schools:
Graduate School of Humanities & Social Sciences
Graduate School of Education
Graduate School of Medical Research
Interdisciplinary Graduate School of Science & Engineering
Graduate School of Life & Environmental Science
Graduate School of Law

Courses and programs offered

Faculty of Law & Literature: Department of Law & Economics
Courses and programs of study offered by Shimane University include the following:
Japanese and East Asian Languages and Cultures
English and European Languages and Cultures
Creation and Understanding of Culture
Law and Politics
Regional Economics
Language and Culture
Social-Cultural Studies

Faculty of Education
Education (including Elementary School Education, Special Support Education, Clinical Psychology in School, Japanese and English Language Education, Social Studies Education, Mathematics Education, Science Education, Environmental Education, Health & Physical Education, Art & Music Education)
MA in Pedagogical Development
MA in Curriculum Development

Faculty of Medicine
Medicine
Nursing
Master's courses in Medical Research, Oncology Pharmacy, Coordinator Course for Rural Medicine and Medical Simulation Instructor Course
Doctorate in Medical Research
Medical Oncology Training
Medical Specialist Training

Interdisciplinary Faculty of Science & Engineering
Physics
Chemistry
Geoscience
Environmental Geology
Natural Hazard Engineering
Pure Mathematics
Mathematical Analysis
Applied Informatics
Computer Science
Control Systems Engineering
Instrumentation Systems Engineering
Electrical and Electronic Systems Engineering
Electronic Devices Engineering
Material Science
Architecture
Mechanical Engineering
Graduate Course in Earth Science and Geo-environmental Science (special program from international students)
Collaborative Educational Course in Science, Engineering and Medicine
Doctorate in Materials Creation and Circulation Technology
Doctorate in Electronic Functions and System Engineering

Faculty of Life & Environmental Science
Agriculture
Forestry
Environmental Biology
Rural Economics
Ecology and Environmental Sciences
Environmental Resources Engineering
Rural Engineering
Life Science and Biotechnology
Biological Science
Forest Science
Agricultural Science
Marine Biological Science
Master's degree in Biological Science and Biotechnology
Master's degree in Agriculture and Forest Science
Master's degree in Environmental Science and Technology

Graduate School of Law
Juris Doctor (prerequisite for Japanese Bar Examination)

Degrees offered
Shimane University offers undergraduate degrees, graduate degrees (including master's degrees and Doctorates) and specialist degrees such as the Graduate School of Law's Juris Doctor degree.

Affiliated institutions
Shimane University incorporates or is affiliated with the following institutions (among others):
Shimane University Hospital
Shimane University Elementary School
Shimane University Middle School
San-in Region Research Center
Center for Integrated Research in Science
Research Center for Coastal Lagoon Environments
International Joint Research Institute of Shimane University and Ningxia University (China)
University Museum

Shimane University Hospital

The University Hospital, on the Izumo campus, was established in 1979 and extensively renovated in 2011. It is one of the largest hospitals — and the only teaching hospital — in Shimane Prefecture. The hospital covers all major specialties. It is home to Shimane Prefecture's Cancer Center and has a palliative care center, pediatric center and advanced ER, ICU and operating facilities. The hospital also specializes in rural medicine. It has nearly 1,168 medical and support staff and 606 beds.

International programs

The university has an active and growing international program. Shima-dai has official ties with 38 universities around the world and each year hosts approximately 200 students from countries such as China, Bangladesh, Vietnam, Korea, Indonesia, Mongolia, Sri Lanka, Germany, France, the UK and the US.

United States
 Central Washington University, Washington, since 1982
 Kent State University Ohio, since 1982
 University of California, Davis, California, since 1986
 University of Arkansas Arkansas, since 1993
 University of Colorado, Denver, School of Medicine Colorado, since 2006
 University of Texas at Dallas, Texas, since 2007
 University of Florida, Department of Languages, Literatures and Cultures, College of Liberal Arts and Sciences Florida, since 2009
 The University of Arizona, Arizona, since 2010

Korea
 Yonsei University Seoul, since 1989
 Busan National University of Education Busan, since 1990
 Gyeongsang National University Jinju, since 1991
 Kyungpook National University Daegu, since 1991
 Seoul National University of Science & Technology Seoul, since 1998

China
 Northeast Forestry University, Heilongjiang, since 1989
 Nanjing Forestry University, Jiangsu, since  1993
 China Agricultural University, Beijing, since 1996
 Ningxia University, Ningxia, since 1997
 Beijing Forestry University, Beijing, since 1997
 Jilin University, Jilin, since 1999
 Hebei Normal University, Hebei, since 2002
 Dalian University, Liaoning, since 2003
 Ningxia Medical University, Ningxia, since 2004
 Beijing Normal University, Beijing, since 2004
 Renmin University of China, School of Economics Beijing, since 2005
 Shandong University Shandong, since 2005
 Zhejiang University, College of Education Zhejiang, since 2006

Mongolia
 Mongolian University of Science and Technology Ulaanbaatar, since 1999
 Health Sciences University of Mongolia Ulaanbaatar, since 2002

Vietnam
 Hanoi Medical University Hanoi, Vietnam, since  2005

Nepal
 Tribhuvan University Kathmandu, Nepal, since 1991

Indonesia
 Andalas University Padang, Indonesia, since 1997

Sweden
 Linkoping University Linkoping, Sweden, since 2005

Germany
 University of Trier Trier, Germany, since 2008

France
 Jean Moulin-Lyon 3 University Lyon, France, since 1990
 The University of Orleans Orleans, France, since 2002

Thailand
 King Mongkut’s University of Technology Thonburi, School of Bioresources and Technology Bangkok, Thailand, since 2010
 Mahidol University, Faculty of Medicine Siriraj Hospital Bangkok, Thailand, since 2011

Bangladesh
 University of Dhaka Dhaka,  Bangladesh, since 2011

Facilities
Shimane University has the following facilities:
Gymnasiums
Martial arts budo-kan
Athletics track
Soccer & baseball fields
Swimming pool
Archery range
Student Club Building
Student Center
Cooperative (including book shop and cafe)
Information Technology Center
Central library
Health Center

Alumni

The following individuals studied at Shimane University:
 Takashi Nagai, author of The bell of Nagasaki, 1908-1951
 Hajime Shinoda, literacy critic, 1927-1989
 Yasuji Hanamori, founding editor of Notebook of life (暮しの手帳), 1911-1978
 Den Fujita, founder of McDonald's Holdings Japan, 1926-2004

Transport/access

Both the Matsue and Izumo campuses of Shimane University are easily accessible by rail, road and air. The Matsue campus is 2 kilometres from Matsue station (rail) and 30 minutes from Izumo and Yonago airports (which offer direct flights to Tokyo, Osaka and Seoul). The Izumo campus is a few minutes from Izumo station (rail) and 30 minutes to Izumo airport (direct flights to Tokyo and Osaka).

Rankings
The university was ranked 61st (out of XX) in Japan by University Ranking by Academic performance in 2011. The Interdisciplinary faculty of Science and Engineering was ranked 1st in Japan by Shukan Asahi（週刊朝日進学Mook）2012 concerning ratio of faculty member earned the Doctor degree of Science and Engineering.

References

External links

Official website of Faculty of Law and Literature (Japanese)
Official website of Faculty of Education  
Official website of Faculty of Medicine  (Japanese)
Official website of Interdisciplinary Faculty of Science and Engineering 
Official website of Faculty of Life and Environmental Science 
Official website of Graduate School of Law   (Japanese)
Official website of University Hospital (Japanese)
Official website of the Center for International Exchanges 

Universities and colleges in Shimane Prefecture
Educational institutions established in 1949
Japanese national universities
1949 establishments in Japan